Elsayed Hafez (Arabic: السيد حافظ) is an Egyptian author, born in Alexandria, Egypt in 1948.

life 
Elsayed Hafez graduated from Alexandria University in 1976, in the departments of philosophy and sociology at the Faculty of Education. He was in charge of the culture department of Sout Al-Khaleej magazine in Kuwait in 1976. From 1974 to 1976, he worked as a theatre specialist in Alexandria. From 1978 to 1986, he worked for the National Council for Culture, Arts, and Literature as a journalist, researcher, secretary in editing the Alem Al-maarefah (World of Knowledge) series, chairman of the committee to encourage local literature, head of the school theatre and heritage seminar, secretary in Al-Arabi exhibition in Kuwait, secretary of World Culture magazine. He worked at Al-Seyassah newspaper in Kuwait from 1977 to 1987 in the culture section, arts section, every day's supplement, Meraat Almaraah Magazine, Alhadaf newspaper, investigation department, Arab affairs department, society page, editorial secretary. He was an animation development consultant at Skhar Foundation in 1994. From 2006 to 2007, he worked at the AlSada foundation in Dubai as the managing editor of Alshashah magazine, managing editor of Almughamer magazine, and a media consultant. He was an office manager at Afkar magazine in Cairo, the director of the Arab World Center for publishing and media for five years, he worked for a Kuwait politics newspaper for seven years, and was a consultant of programs development for Joint Program Production Institution in Kuwait, he was the first Arab whom the British Kingdom published seven English plays for, he is also the first Arab writer for whom the University of Arizona in the United States published five works in English and three in Arabic. He was a chief editor of Roya magazine, which is published in Egypt, he is the first Arabic writer to print his work for children and adults online. He has many publications, including (plays for adults- plays for children), also he directed many other plays.  He formed many experimental theatre groups, he also has many TV and radio series. Hafez has many books and theatrical studies. His works was published in many Arabic magazines and newspapers, he participated in the International Festival of Cartage, Tunisia, Baghdad (Iraq), Jordan, Abu Dhabi, Cairo, Alexandria, Matrouh.

Memberships 
 Arab Writers' Union
 Egyptian Writers' Union
 Egyptian Representative Trade Union
 Egyptian Film Trades Union
 International PEN Egypt Club
 Honorary member of the American Theater Education Organization, University of Arizona, United States

Works

Novels

 A Traveler Without Identity (Musafer bla haweyah) – 1993
 Nescafe – 2010: Alsayed Hafez says in this novel: "I love my country that I can hold every night in my lap as a rose, or a pillow, or a sentence in a phrase that I love as it is on the edge of the cemetery stained with blood and misery from thousands of years ago."
 Plain Coffee (Qahwa sada) – 2011: a narrative epic about fate, mystery, and adoration.
 Cappuccino – 2012
 Tea with Jasmine (Shai belyasmeen) – 2013
 Green Tea (Shai Akhdar) – 2014

Theatre
 The Pride of Nonsense in the Land of Meaningless (Kebriya altafaha fi belad allamaanah) – 1970
 The Dumb Drums in the Blue Medicine (Altubul alkharsaa fi aladweah alzarqaa) – 1971
 The Symphony of Love (Semfoniat alhob) (collection) – 1980
 Honey I Am Travelling (Habibati ana msafer) – 1979
 They Are What They Are, But They Are Not the Zaalik (Hom kma hom wa lakenahom lais hom alzaalik) – 1980
 The emergence and disappearance of Abu Dhar Al-Ghafari (Zuhour wa ekhtifaa Abu thar alghafari) – 1981
 My Beloved Princess of Cinema (Habibati Ameerat alcinema) – 1982
 The Tale of the Peasant Abdulmutee (Hekayat alfalah Abdulmutee) – 1982
 Time of the Word Lying/ Fear/ Death (Ya zaman alkalema  alkatheb/ alkhouf/ almoot) – 1987
 6 Men in Prison (Sitat rejal fi mutaqal) – 1989
 Symphony of Love (Semfoniat alhob) – 1991
 The Pride of Nonsense in the Land of Meaningless (Kebraa altafaha fi belad allamaanah) – 1991
 Sisyphus 20th Century (Sezef alqaren aleshreen) – 1991
 9 Experimental Plays
 Trees Sometimes Bend (Alashjar tanhany ahyanan) – 1992
 Travels of Ibn Basboussa (Rehlat Ibn Basboussa) – 1994
 The King of Trash (Malek alzubalah) – 1995
 Rumor (Eshaah) (6 plays one chapter) – 1995
 Medal from the President (Wesam men alraees) – 1997
 Travelers Without Identity (Musaferoon bla haweyah) – 1997
 Abdullah (Alnadeem) – 1997
 Qaraqosh and Aragoz (Qaraqosh wa Aragoz) – 1998
 Mallow War (Hareb almloukheaah) – 2000
 The King of Trash (Malek alzubalah) – 2001
 Faces in the Lost Nights (Wejouh fi allayali alzaeeah) – 2003
 The Gypsy and the Tramp (Alghajaryah wa alsaalouk) – 2003
 Kidnapped Me, SOBs (Khatafoni welad alayh) – 2004
 Baby, Shell, and Rainbow (Tefel wa qawqaah wa qawzquzah) – 2004
 The Maid and the Old Woman (Alkhademah wa alajouz) – 2004
 Wanted Dead Or Alive (Matloub haian aw maietan) – 2004
 Two Women (Emraeatan) – 2004
 Peasant Abdulmutee (Alfalah Abdulmutee) and five other plays – 2004

Children's theatre
 Sandus – 1987
 Ali Baba – 1987
 Antar Ben Shadad – 1987
 Knights of Hilal Sons (Fursan bani Hilal) – 1987
 Abu Zaid Alhilali – 1995
 Happiness Shirt (Qamees alsaadah) – 1995
 Juha Sons (Awlad Juha) – 1996
 Cinderella – 1996
 Dewdrops (Qeter alnada) – 1996
 Roman's Love (Hob Al-Roman) – 1996
 The Wondrous Monster (Alwahesh Alajeeb) – 1996
 Cinderella and the Prince (Cinderella wa alameer) – 1996
 Nanoosa and Uncle Kamal (Nanoosa we alam Kamal) – 1996
 Hamdan and Meshmesha (Hamdan wa meshmesha) – 1996
 Koki Loves the Moon (Koki tuheb alqamar) – 2003
 Sandus – 2004

Awards 

 First prize in Theater Writing in Egypt, 1970.
 Award for Best Author of Children's Theater in Kuwait for Cinderella in 1980.

References 

1948 births
Living people
Egyptian writers
Alexandria University alumni